Wildhorse Resort & Casino is a casino owned and operated since 1994 by the Confederated Tribes of the Umatilla Indian Reservation in the U.S. state of Oregon.

History
The casino opened in temporary buildings on November 5, 1994, run by Capital Gaming International Inc., with the tribe taking over as managers in 1999. The resort has expanded each year since its beginning, doubling the size of the casino in 2002 and 2003, adding a conference center in 2004, completely renovating its 100-room hotel in 2005 and expanding in 2006-07 to add four food and beverage venues: a buffet restaurant, a fine-dining restaurant, a sports bar, a coffee shop and a 24-hour restaurant.  After contentious discussion within the tribal community, the previously "dry" (not serving alcoholic beverages) resort, located on a dry reservation, began serving alcoholic beverages on May 5, 2006. Because of this change, a lounge, Wildhorse Sports Bar, opened in May 2007. Work begin in 2010 to expand the hotel by 202 rooms with a ten-story tower, and add  to the casino. The $45 million project was completed in October 2011.

Amenities

Key components of the resort are a casino, five screen cineplex with two 3D screens, golf course, hotel, recreational vehicle park, children's entertainment center, teepee camping village, Arrowhead Travel Plaza and the Tamástslikt Cultural Institute tribal museum. The casino offers poker, roulette, blackjack, craps, Spanish 21, bingo, keno and just over 1200 slot machines, 30% of which are in a no-smoking area.

The golf course is a championship, 18-hole course designed by John Steidel that opened in 1997, with approximately 30,000 rounds played annually and hosting about 80 tournaments.  It includes a driving range, practice greens, rental clubs, a pro shop, and a variety of teaching programs.

Seven restaurants are part of the resort and casino: WildRoast Cafe, the Clubhouse Grill, Hot Rock Cafe, Kinship Cafe, Traditions Buffet, The Wildhorse Sports Bar and Plateau Fine Dining.

The hotel is connected to the casino while the RV Park is located nearby, between the casino and golf course.

The Tamástslikt Cultural Institute, located on the resort grounds, includes permanent and rotating exhibits on the history and culture of the three tribes who make up the Confederated Tribes of the Umatilla Indian Reservation (CTUIR): the Cayuse, Umatilla and Walla Walla.

The resort has sparked an economic boom for the CTUIR, which has increased the tribal operating budget from less than $10 million in 1992 to approximately $145 million in 2007. That grew to $190 million in 2010 as the casino draws approximately 750,000 people each year. The largest expenditures and the largest single department in the tribal government are devoted to protecting and restoring natural resources on the reservation and throughout the traditional homelands of the three tribes. To this end, the tribes are one of the largest employers of biologists and other environmental scientists in the region.

See also
Gambling in Oregon
List of casinos in Oregon

References

External links
Wildhorse Resort & Casino, official website

 

Casinos in Oregon
Casino hotels
Buildings and structures in Umatilla County, Oregon
Resorts in Oregon
Native American casinos
Tourist attractions in Umatilla County, Oregon
1994 establishments in Oregon
Native American history of Oregon